Azevedo is a common surname in the Portuguese language, and thus native to Portugal, Brazil, and other Lusophone nations. The etymology of "Azevedo" is usually connected to the Portuguese word "azevinho" meaning the European holly (Ilex aquifolium). Its Spanish equivalent is Acevedo or Acebedo, whose origin resides in the Leonese municipality of Acebedo, Spain. Notable people with this surname include the following:

Aluísio Azevedo (1837-1913), Brazilian writer
Ángela de Azevedo, 17th century Spanish and Portuguese playwright
Belmiro de Azevedo (1938–2017), Portuguese entrepreneur and the richest person in Portugal
Bento da Fonseca de Azevedo, early 18th-century Portuguese master carver
Eduardo Azevedo (born 1981), Brazilian race car driver
Filipa Azevedo (born 1991), Portuguese singer
Geraldo Azevedo (born 1945), Brazilian singer & guitarist
Gerard Dominique de Azevedo Coutinho y Bernal, historian and chronicler in the 18th century Southern Netherlands
Inácio de Azevedo (1526–1570), Jesuit missionary and martyr
Dom Jerónimo de Azevedo (1560-1625), governor of Portuguese Ceylon and Viceroy of Portuguese India
José Azevedo (born 1973), Portuguese professional cyclist
José Batista Pinheiro de Azevedo (1917-1983), Portuguese politician
Joseph Felix Antoine François de Azevedo Coutinho y Bernal, historian in the 18th century Southern Netherlands
Justin Azevedo (born 1988), Canadian professional ice hockey player
Luiz de Azevedo, Portuguese Jesuit missionary in Ethiopia
Márcio Azevedo (born 1986), Brazilian footballer
Count Don Pedro Henriquez d'Azevedo y Toledo de Fuentes (1525-1610), Spanish general and statesman
Reinaldo Azevedo (born 1961), Brazilian journalist
Ricardo Azevedo (born 1956), Brazilian professional water polo coach
Roberto Azevêdo (born 1957), Brazilian WTO diplomat 
Tony Azevedo (born 1981), American water polo player
Valdir Azevedo (1923-1980), Brazilian conductor and performer
Erik d'Azevedo (born 1948), American painter and poet

Portuguese-language surnames